Smychka was a popular political term in Soviet Russia and Soviet Union. It can be roughly translated as "collaboration in society" "union", "alliance", "joining the  ranks". The generic meaning of the noun "смычка", derived from the verb "сомкнуть", is joining of two things: contact, joint, linkage, coupling, like joining the two opposite branches of a railroad whose construction was started from both ends.

The best known example of the usage of the term was the motto and the Soviet politics of "smychka of the city and the village" ("смычка города и деревни"), which was understood as the alliance of proletariat and the poor peasantry.

Another example was "smychka of Christianity and social revolution", see "Voskresenie".

References

External links
1924: Scissors Crisis - "Smychka and the Scissors Crisis", at Seventeen Moments in Soviet History, an essay by Lewis Siegelbaum

Soviet internal politics
Soviet phraseology